Donald Eric Tandy (20 December 1918 – 9 May 2014) was an English actor who appeared in over a dozen films (usually in minor or uncredited roles) and several dozens of televisions shows during his career. He played potman Tom Clements in EastEnders from 1986 through 1988.

Career
Tandy started his career in 1950 in the low-budget film Chance of a Lifetime.

He appeared in many television programmes including Man from Interpol, You Can't Win, The Avengers, The Saint, Danger Man, Sergeant Cork, Sherlock Holmes, The Troubleshooters, and Colditz.

Starting in 1986, he appeared in EastEnders as the Queen Vic potman, Tom Clements. His last appearance was in 1988.

Partial filmology

Film
 Chance of a Lifetime (1950)
 Hand in Hand (1960)
 Crossroads to Crime (1960)
 The Middle Course (1961)
 Playback (1962)
 Farewell Performance (1963)
 Game for Three Losers (1965)
 Twenty-One (1991) - Bobby's Father (Last appearance)

Television
 Sunday Night Theatre (2 episodes, 1950–1959)
 Redgauntlet (1 episode, 1959)
 Man from Interpol (2 episodes, 1960)
 ITV Play of the Week (1 episode, 1960)
 The Winter's Tale (1962)
 The Avengers (1 episode, 1962)
 Hancock (1 episode, 1963)
 The Saint (1 episode, 1963)
 Suspense (2 episodes, 1963)
 Dr. Finlay's Casebook (1 episode, 1963)
 The Edgar Wallace Mystery Theatre (1 episode, 1965)
 Sergeant Cork (2 episodes, 1966)
 Sherlock Holmes (1 episode, 1968)
 Mogul (1 episode, 1969)
 Softly Softly (2 episodes, 1966–1970)
 Dixon of Dock Green (2 episodes, 1971–1974)
 Out of the Past (1 episode, 1974)
 Brendon Chase (2 episodes, 1981)
 Weekend Playhouse (1 episode, 1984)
 EastEnders (1986-1988)

References

External links
 

1918 births
2014 deaths
English male film actors
English male television actors
Male actors from London